Species is a 1995 American science fiction horror film directed by Roger Donaldson and written by Dennis Feldman. It stars Ben Kingsley, Michael Madsen, Alfred Molina, Forest Whitaker, Marg Helgenberger, and Natasha Henstridge in her film debut role. The film's plot concerns a motley crew of scientists and government agents who try to track down Sil (Henstridge), a seductive extraterrestrial-human hybrid, before she successfully mates with a human male.

The film was conceived by Feldman in 1987, and was originally pitched as a film treatment in the style of a police procedural, entitled The Message. When The Message failed to attract the studios, Feldman re-wrote it as a spec script, which ultimately led to the making of the film. The extraterrestrial aspect of Sil's character was created by H. R. Giger, who was also responsible for the beings from the Alien franchise. The effects combined practical models designed by Giger collaborator Steve Johnson and XFX, with computer-generated imagery done by Richard Edlund's Boss Film Studios. Giger felt that the film and the character were too similar to Alien, so he pushed for script changes.

Most of the principal photography was done in Los Angeles, California, where the film is set. Several scenes were filmed in Utah and at the Arecibo Observatory in Puerto Rico. Species was met with mixed reviews from critics, who felt that the film's execution did not match the ambition of its premise, but nevertheless was a box office success, partly due to the hype surrounding Henstridge's nude scenes in various tabloid newspapers and lad mags of the time, grossing US$113 million ($ million in  dollars). It spawned a franchise, which includes one theatrical sequel (Species II), as well as two direct-to-television sequels (Species III and Species: The Awakening). Species was adapted into a novel by Yvonne Navarro and two comic book series by Dark Horse Comics, one of which was written by Feldman.

Plot
During the SETI program, Earth's scientists send out transmissions (shown to be the Arecibo message) with information about Earth and its inhabitants, DNA structure, etc., in hopes of finding life beyond Earth. They then receive transmissions from an alien source on how to create endless fuel effortlessly. Therefore, the scientists assume that this is a friendly alien species. From a second alien transmission, the scientists receive information about an alien DNA along with instructions on how to splice it with human DNA. A government team led by Xavier Fitch goes forward with the genetic experiment attempting to induce a female, under the (later proved to be mistaken) assumption that a female would have "more docile and controllable" traits. One of the hundred experimental ova produces a girl named Sil, who looks like a normal human but develops into a 12-year-old in 3 months.

Sil's violent outbursts during sleep make the scientists consider her a threat. One day they try to kill her using cyanide gas, but she breaks out of her containment cell and escapes. The government assembles a team composed of anthropologist Dr. Stephen Arden, molecular biologist Dr. Laura Baker, "empath" Dan Smithson and mercenary Preston "Press" Lennox to track and destroy Sil. Sil matures rapidly into an adult in her early twenties and makes her way to Los Angeles. Her body strength, regenerative ability and intelligence make tracking her extremely difficult. The scientists fear she may mate with human males and produce offspring that could eventually eliminate the human race. Sil is intent on producing offspring as soon as possible, and kills several people to prevent them from notifying the authorities or simply to use their clothing.

She first tries to mate with Robbie, but after sensing that he is diabetic, she rejects him. Unsatisfied, he tries to assault her, prompting her to kill him by puncturing through his pharynx with her tongue. Later she tries to mate with John Carey, a man she meets after a car accident. They swim in Carey's hottub where Sil forces him to open his swimming trunks in order to mate, but he refuses. This act is interrupted by Preston and Laura. She soon kills Carey, morphing into her alien form, a bipedal mutant with tentacles on her shoulders and back, and flees naked into a forest without being seen by the team. She pretends to be a rape victim to kidnap a woman in order to assume her identity. Sitting in the car near Carey's home, she reads Fitch's lips, as she had done earlier, learning of their plan to stake out the nightclub for her return. There, she is seen by Dan, prompting a car chase. She fakes her death by crashing the car, which she has previously filled with gasoline containers, into a high-voltage transformer, using the kidnapped woman as a stand-in for her own body.

After cutting and dyeing her hair, Sil takes an attraction to Preston, having dreamt of him the previous night. After the team celebrates their apparent victory, she stalks them in their hotel, and they do not recognize her. Arden, who is upset at being alone, walks into his room to find Sil waiting there. She has intercourse with Arden, which results in her instantly getting impregnated by him, then kills him when he realizes who she is. Dan senses that Sil is in the hotel and he alerts Preston, Laura, and the rest of the team. She morphs again, escapes and they follow her into the sewers where Fitch is subsequently killed. Sil gives birth, and Dan finds her offspring in a cavern behind the sewers. The child morphs into alien form and attacks him and he incinerates it. Preston blows off Sil's head with a shotgun. The trio leaves the area. The last scene shows a rat chewing on one of Sil's severed tentacles; it starts to mutate into a vicious beast and devours another rat.

Cast
 Natasha Henstridge as Sil
Michelle Williams as Young Sil
 Dana Hee as Alien Sil
 Frank Welker as Alien Sil (voice)
 Ben Kingsley as Xavier Fitch
 Michael Madsen as Preston "Press" Lennox
 Alfred Molina as Dr. Stephen Arden
 Forest Whitaker as Dan Smithson
 Marg Helgenberger as Dr. Laura Baker
 Whip Hubley as John Carey
 Anthony Guidera as Robbie
 Matthew Ashford as Man In Club
 Kurtis Burow as Baby Boy, Sil's Offspring

Influence and themes
Since Sil grows rapidly and kills humans with ease, at a certain point film character Dr. Laura Baker speculates if she was a biological weapon sent by a species who thought humans were like an intergalactic weed. Feldman declared that he wanted to explore this theme further in the script, as it discussed mankind's place in the universe and how other civilizations would perceive and relate to humanity, considering that "maybe [humans are] not a potential threat, maybe a competitor, maybe a resource". He also declared that more could be said about Sil's existentialist doubts, as she does not know her origin or purpose, and only follows her instinct to mate and perpetuate the species.

Writing for the Journal of Popular Film & Television, Susan George authored a paper that dealt with the portrayal of procreation in Species, Gattaca and Mimic. George compares the character of Fitch to "an updated Dr. Frankenstein", and explores the development of Sil's maternal aspirations, which convert the character into an "archaic mother" figure similar to the xenomorph creature in the Alien series, both of which are, she claims, portrayed negatively. George further states that a recurring theme in science fiction films is a response to "this kind of powerful female sexuality and 'alien-ness in that "the feminine monster must die as Sil does at the end of Species". Feldman himself considered that an underlying theme regarded "a female arriving and seeking to find a superior mate".

A five-year investigation into accounts of the chupacabra, a well known cryptid, revealed that the original sighting report of the creature in Puerto Rico by Madeline Tolentino may have been inspired by the character Sil. This was detailed in paranormal investigator and skeptic Benjamin Radford's book Tracking the Chupacabra. According to Virginia Fugarino of Memorial University of Newfoundland writing for the Journal of Folklore Research, Radford found a link between the original eyewitness report and the design of Sil in her alien form, and hypothesized that "[Species], which [Tolentino] did see before her sighting, influenced what she believes she saw of the chupacabra".

Production

Writing and development
Dennis Feldman had the idea for Species in 1987, as he worked on another film about an alien invasion, Real Men. Having read an article by Arthur C. Clarke about the insurmountable odds against an extraterrestrial craft ever locating and visiting Earth, given that stellar distances are great, and faster-than-light travel is unlikely, Feldman started to think that it was "unsophisticated for any alien culture to come here in what [he]'d describe as a big tin can". Thus in turn he considered that the possibility of extraterrestrial contact was through information. Then he detailed that a message would contain instructions from across the void to build something that would talk to men. Instead of a mechanical device, Feldman imagined wetware. The visitor would adapt to Earth's environment through DNA belonging to Earth's organisms. Mankind has sent to space transmissions "giving out directions" such as the Arecibo message, which Feldman considered unwary, as they relay information to potential predators from outer space. He pointed out that "in nature, one species would not want a predator to know where it hides".

Therefrom emerged a film treatment called The Message. The original script had more of a police procedural approach, with the alien being created by a "bathtub geneticist" who had just had his project aborted by the government, and a biologist who had worked on the project getting along with a police officer to search for the creature. Eventually Feldman came to believe this concept had some credibility issues, and instead changed the protagonists to a government team. After coining the name "Sil", Feldman initially thought of forming an acronym, but in the end chose only the three-letter name after learning about the codons of the genetic code, which can be represented in groups of three letters. Sil would originally emerge from a DNA sequence manipulating human DNA, and constantly mutate as she used the human junk DNA to access "all the defenses of the entire animal kingdom that [humans] evolved through – including ones that had never developed, plus ones [Earth's scientists] don't know about that have become extinct". Among the research Feldman did for the script included going to sessions of UCLA's Center for the Study of Evolution and the Origin of Life (CSEOL), talking to SETI scientists, and visiting the Salk Institute for Biological Studies to talk with researchers working on the Human Genome Project. The Message was offered to several studios, but was passed up.

In 1993, Feldman reworked his ideas into a spec script. This was sent to producer Frank Mancuso, Jr., who had hired Feldman to adapt Sidney Kirkpatrick's A Cast of Killers. The producer got attracted to the creative possibilities as the film offered "the challenge of walking that fine line between believability and pushing something as far as it can go". Metro-Goldwyn-Mayer got interested on the project, and while Feldman had some initial disagreements on the budget, after considering other studios he signed with MGM. In turn, the now retitled Species attracted director Roger Donaldson, who was attracted to its blend of science fiction and thriller. The script underwent eight different drafts, written over an eight-month period, before Donaldson was content that flaws in the story's logic had been corrected. At one point another writer, Larry Gross, tried his hand with the script, but ultimately all the work was done by Feldman. Feldman would remain as a co-producer. While the initial Species script suggested a love triangle between Sil and two government team members, the dissatisfaction of the crew eventually led to changes to the ending, which ended up featuring Sil having a baby that would immediately prove dangerous.

When Donaldson was announced as the director in 1994, Mancuso stated that most of the $35 million budget would be spent on effects, as "it's not a movie that calls for stars. We're going to try and put as much money as we can below the line and allow the effects and the creature to be the highlights of the film". The lesser emphasis on actors included a newcomer as the human version of the creature, Sil, former model Natasha Henstridge.

Design

Sil was designed by Swiss artist H. R. Giger, who also created the creatures in the Alien films. Donaldson thought Giger was the best man for the film after reading his compendium Necronomicon, and eventually he and Mancuso flew to Switzerland to meet the artist. What attracted Giger was the opportunity to design "a monster in another way—an aesthetic warrior, also sensual and deadly, like the women look in [his] paintings". While Giger opted to stay in Switzerland to take care of his dying mother instead of flying to Los Angeles to accompany production, he built some puppets in his own studio, and later faxed sketches and airbrush paintings as production went through.

The practical models were made by Steve Johnson and his company XFX, which had already worked with Giger's designs in Poltergeist II: The Other Side. Giger had envisioned more stages of Sil's transformation, but the film only employed the last one, where she is "transparent outside and black inside—like a glass body but with carbon inside", with XFX doing the translucent skin based on what they had done for the aliens of The Abyss. Sil's alien form had both full-body animatronics with replaceable arms, heads and torsos, and a body suit. Richard Edlund's Boss Film Studios was hired for over 50 shots of computer-generated imagery, which included one of the earliest forms of motion capture effects. Using a two-foot-high (60 cm) electric puppet that had sensors translating its movements to a digital Sil, Boss Films managed to achieve in one day what would have once taken as much as three weeks with practical effects.

Giger was unhappy with some elements he found to bear similarity with other films, particularly the Alien franchise. At one point he sent a fax to Mancuso finding five similarities: a "chestburster" (as Sil giving birth echoed the infant Alien breaking out of its host's chest), the creature having a punching tongue (Giger at first wanted Sil's tongue to be composed of barbed hooks), a cocoon, the use of flame throwers, and having Giger as the creature designer. A great point of contention was the ending, which Giger considered derivative from the climaxes from both Alien 3 and Terminator 2: Judgment Day. The designer felt that horror films frequently held some final confrontation with fire, which he considered old-fashioned and linked to medieval witch trials. He sent some ideas for the climax to the producers, with them accepting to have Sil's ultimate death occurring by headshot.

Filming
Filming happened mostly in Los Angeles, including location shooting at Sunset Strip, Silver Lake, Pacific Palisades, the Hollywood Hills and the Biltmore Hotel. Id Club, the nightclub featured in the film, was built within Hollywood's Pantages Theater, while the hills above Dodger Stadium near Elysian Park were used for the car chase and crash where Sil fakes her death. For the opening scenes in Utah, the Tooele Army Depot dubbed as the outside of the research facility—the interiors were shot at the Rockwell International Corporation laboratory in California—and a Victorian-era train station in Brigham City was part of Sil's escape. Other locations included the  Santa Monica Pier and the Arecibo Telescope in Puerto Rico. The most complex sets involved the sewer complex and a tar-filled granite cavern where the ending occurs. Donaldson wanted a maze quality for the sewers, which had traces of realism (such as tree roots breaking through from the ceiling) and artistic licenses. Production designer John Muto intentionally designed the sewers wider and taller than real ones, as well as with walkways, but nevertheless aiming for a claustrophobic and realistic atmosphere. The tunnels were built out of structural steel, metal rod, plaster and concrete to endure the fire effects, and had its design based on the La Brea Tar Pits, with Muto describing them as "just the sort of place in which a creature from another planet might feel at home".

Release
Species received a wide theatrical release on July 7, 1995. Its opening weekend was $17.1 million, MGM's biggest opening at the time and second in the box office ranking behind Apollo 13. Budgeted at $35 million, the film earned a total of $113 million worldwide ($ million adjusted for inflation), including $60 million in the United States. Audiences polled by CinemaScore during opening weekend gave the film an average grade of "B−" on a scale ranging from A+ to F. 

MGM Home Entertainment released the film on DVD in March 1997, which contains a booklet with trivia and production notes, and on VHS in August 1999. In July 2006, MGM released it on Blu-ray, whose supplements includes several featurettes as well as two audio commentary tracks: one by director Roger Donaldson, Natasha Henstridge and Michael Madsen, and another from Donaldson, cinematographer Andrzej Bartkowiak, make-up effects creator Steve Johnson, visual effects supervisor Richard Edlund and producer Frank Mancuso Jr. In July 2017, Scream Factory released a collector's edition Blu-ray, issued with a concoction of new and archival bonus contents which have been ported over from original DVD and Blu-ray versions.

Reception
On review aggregator Rotten Tomatoes, the film received an approval rating of 44% based on 71 reviews, with an average rating of 5.30/10 and a critical consensus which reads "Species shows flashes of the potential to blend exploitation and sci-fi horror in ingenious ways, but is ultimately mainly interested in flashing star Natasha Henstridge's skin". On Metacritic, the film has a weighted average score of 49 out of 100 based on 25 critics, indicating "mixed or average reviews".

Roger Ebert gave it 2 out of 4 stars, criticizing the film's plot and overall lack of intelligence. Cristine James from Boxoffice magazine gave the film 2 out of 5 stars, describing it as "Alien meets V meets Splash meets Playboy's Erotic Fantasies: Forbidden Liaisons, diluted into a diffuse, misdirected bore". James Berardinelli gave the film 2½ out of 4 stars, stating that "as long as you don't stop to think about what's going on, Species is capable of offering its share of cheap thrills, with a laugh or two thrown in as well". Owen Gleiberman of Entertainment Weekly found the film lacking in imagination and special effects, also commenting that Alfred Molina "sport[s] a haircut that's scarier than the creature". Variety'''s review of the film described it as a "gripping if not overly original account of an extraterrestrial species attempting to overwhelm our own" and that Ben Kingsley and other lead actors "have only two-dimensional roles to engage them". The review notes the similarity between H.R. Giger's design of Sil and his work on Alien.

Scott Weinberg of DVD Talk praised the acting, Feldman's screenplay and Donaldson's direction. He concluded by saying that Species makes for "a very good time for the genre fans". Mick LaSalle, writing for San Francisco Chronicle, was notedly less enthusiastic, quipping that if "Species were a little bit worse, it would have a shot at becoming a camp classic". Los Angeles Times critic Peter Rainer described Species as "a pretty good Boo! movie", finding it an entertaining thriller while unoriginal and with ineffective tonal shifts.

Related works
Adaptations
Yvonne Navarro co-wrote a novelization based on the original screenplay with Dennis Feldman. The book gives several in-depth details about the characters not seen in the film, such as Sil's ability to visualize odors and determine harmful substances from edible items by the color. Gas appears black, food appears pink, and an unhealthy potential mate appears to give off green fumes. Other character details include Preston's background in tracking down AWOL soldiers as well as the process of decoding the alien signal. Although no clues are given as to its origin, it is mentioned that the message was somehow routed through several black holes to mask its point of origin. An audiobook version narrated by Alfred Molina won the Audie Award for Solo Performance.

Dark Horse Comics published a four-issue comic book adapting the film, written by Feldman and penciled by Jon Foster. Dark Horse would also publish a mini-series with an all-new storyline, Species: Human Race, released in 1997. West End Games released a World of Species sourcebook for its Masterbook role-playing game system. MGM had partnered with Cyberdreams to make a computer game based on the film, and while the company managed to release an H.R. Giger screen saver featuring Species images, the game never came to be due to Cyberdreams' closure.

Sequels

The first sequel to Species, Species II was released theatrically on April 10, 1998. The film depicts astronauts on a mission to Mars being attacked by the aliens from Species, and the events that ensue upon their return to Earth. There, Dr. Baker has been working on Eve, a more docile clone of Sil. Madsen and Helgenberger reprised their roles, while Henstridge played Eve. Species II received overwhelmingly negative reviews from critics, garnering a 9% approval rating at Rotten Tomatoes, and Madsen denounced it as a terrible film. The film's director, Peter Medak, attributed the failure of the film to not picking up the infected rat ending of the original film. Navarro later authored the novelization for Species II which followed the film's original screenplay with added scenes.

The second sequel, Species III, followed in 2004. It premiered on Sci-Fi Channel on November 27, with a DVD release on December 7. The film's plot starts where Species II ends, revolving around Sunny Mabrey's character Sara, the daughter of Eve, reared by a doctor played by Robert Knepper. Sara, an alien-human hybrid, seeks other hybrids to mate with. Henstridge appears in a cameo at the beginning of the film. Two out of six critics mentioned on Rotten Tomatoes gave it a positive rating, with DVD Talk's reviewer noting that it is "a more cohesive and sensible flick than [Species II] is, but ultimately, it's just a lot of the same old schtick", while Film Freak Central called it "amateurish" and "vapid". A fourth film, Species: The Awakening came out in 2007, following the schedule of Species III of Sci-Fi Channel premiere and subsequent DVD release. None of the actors from the original film returned in this sequel, which instead starred Helena Mattsson as the alien-hybrid seductress.

See also
 A for Andromeda (1961)
 Demon Seed (1977)
 Splice (2009)
 Under The Skin'' (2013)

References

External links
 
 
 

Species (film series)
1995 films
1995 horror films
1990s chase films
1990s monster movies
1990s science fiction horror films
American chase films
American science fiction horror films
American science fiction action films
American action thriller films
American science fiction thriller films
1990s English-language films
Films directed by Roger Donaldson
Films scored by Christopher Young
Metro-Goldwyn-Mayer films
Films shot in Utah
Films set in Los Angeles
Films shot in Los Angeles
Films shot in Puerto Rico
Films adapted into comics
American action horror films
Fictional extraterrestrial–human hybrids
American pregnancy films
1990s pregnancy films
1990s American films